Cisthene unifascia is a moth of the family Erebidae. It was described by Augustus Radcliffe Grote and Coleman Townsend Robinson in 1868. It is found in the southern United States (Arkansas, California, Mississippi, Oklahoma, South Carolina and Texas) and Mexico.

Adults are quite variable in color and in the width and shape of the yellow band on the forewing. They are on wing from March to May and again from August to October.

References

Cisthenina
Moths described in 1868